The Diocese of Exeter is a Church of England diocese covering the county of Devon. It is one of the largest dioceses in England.  The Cathedral Church of St Peter in Exeter is the seat of the diocesan Bishop of Exeter. It is part of the Province of Canterbury. The diocesan bishop (Robert Atwell since 30 April 2014) is assisted by two suffragan bishops, the Bishop of Crediton and the Bishop of Plymouth. The See of Crediton was created in 1897 and the See of Plymouth in 1923.

History
The Diocese of Crediton was created out of the Diocese of Sherborne in AD 909 to cover the area of Devon and Cornwall. Crediton was chosen as the site for its cathedral, possibly due it having been the birthplace of Saint Boniface and also the existence of a monastery there.

In 1046, Leofric became the Bishop of Crediton: following his appointment he decided that the see should be moved to the larger, more culturally significant and defensible walled town of Exeter. In 1050, King Edward the Confessor authorised that Exeter was to be the seat of the bishop for Devon and Cornwall and that a cathedral was to be built there for the bishop's throne. Thus, Leofric became the last diocesan Bishop of Crediton and the first Bishop of Exeter.

The diocese remained unchanged until 1876, when the former Archdeaconry of Cornwall became the independent Diocese of Truro.

Organisation

Bishops
The current diocesan Bishop of Exeter is Robert Atwell, who is assisted by Jackie Searle, Bishop suffragan of Crediton and James Grier, Bishop suffragan of Plymouth. The provincial episcopal visitor (for parishes in this diocese – among twelve others in the western part of the Province of Canterbury – which do not accept the ordination of women as priests, since 1994) is the Bishop suffragan of Ebbsfleet (for traditional Anglo-Catholics), and Rod Thomas, Bishop of Maidstone (for Conservative Evangelicals); they are licensed as honorary assistant bishops in the diocese.

There are three former bishops licensed as honorary assistant bishops in the diocese:
2005–present: Richard Hawkins, retired former Bishop suffragan of Plymouth and of Crediton, lives in Whipton.
2010–present: Martin Shaw, a retired former Bishop of Argyll and the Isles, lives in Exeter itself.
2018–present: Mark Rylands, former Bishop of Shrewsbury, lives in Ashburton

Archdeaconries and deaneries
The diocese is divided into four archdeaconries. The Bishop suffragan of Crediton generally oversees the Archdeaconries of Barnstaple and Exeter and the Bishop suffragan of Plymouth the Archdeaconries of Plymouth and Totnes.

The following mergers of deaneries have taken place:

 the deaneries of Tiverton and Cullompton merged in 2012 to form the deanery of Tiverton & Cullompton
 the deaneries of Devonport, Moorside and Sutton merged in 2015 to form the deanery of Plymouth City.

*including Cathedral

Coat of arms
The arms of the diocese are Gules two keys in saltire Or a sword hilt downwards in pale Argent with hilt Or surmounted by a mitre. The charges are emblems of Saints Peter (keys) and Paul (sword) who are the patron saints of the cathedral.

List of churches 
Last fully updated 5 October 2018.

Outside deanery structures

Deanery of Aylesbeare

Deanery of Cadbury 

1part of the North Creedy West Mission Community

2part of the North Creedy East Mission Community

Deanery of Christianity 

1part of the East Exeter Mission Community

2part of the West Exe Mission Community

Deanery of Honiton

Deanery of Kenn

Deanery of Ottery

Deanery of Tiverton & Cullompton 

1part of the Tiverton Mission Community

Deanery of Moreton 

1part of the Bovey Valley Mission Community

Deanery of Newton Abbot and Ipplepen 

1part of the Abbotskerswell Mission Community

Deanery of Okehampton

Deanery of Torbay  

1part of the Our Lady & All the Saints Mission Community

2part of the West Torquay Mission Community

3part of the All Saints & St Luke Mission Community

Deanery of Totnes 

1part of the Three Rivers Mission Community

Deanery of Woodleigh

Deanery of Barnstaple 

1part of the Coast and 'Combe Mission Community (which also includes the parishes of Berrynarbor and Combe Martin from Shirwell deanery)

2part of the Barnstaple Mission Community

Deanery of Hartland

Deanery of Holsworthy 

1part of the Holsworthy Mission Community

Deanery of Shirwell 

1part of the Coast and 'Combe Mission Community (which also includes seven churches from Barnstaple deanery)

2part of the Lyn Valley Mission Community

Deanery of South Molton

Deanery of Torrington 

1part of the Winkleigh Mission Community

Deanery of Ivybridge 

1part of the South Dartmoor Mission Community

2part of the Yealm & Erme Mission Community

3part of the Yealmside Mission Community

Deanery of Plymouth City 

1part of the Holy Family Mission Community

2part of the Sacred Heart Mission Community

Deanery of Tavistock 

1part of the Tamar Mission Community

2part of the Tavy Mission Community

See also
List of the bishops of Exeter

References

Further reading
Oliver, George (1846) Monasticon Dioecesis Exoniensis: being a collection of records and instruments illustrating the ancient conventual, collegiate, and eleemosynary foundations, in the Counties of Cornwall and Devon, with historical notices, and a supplement, comprising a list of the dedications of churches in the Diocese, an amended edition of the taxation of Pope Nicholas, and an abstract of the Chantry Rolls; [with supplement and index]. Exeter: P. A. Hannaford, 1846, 1854, 1889

External links
Diocese of Exeter
Ancient Diocese of Exeter – from the Catholic Encyclopedia
Diocesan prayer diaries giving lists of Mission Communities within the diocese 

 
Exeter
Exeter
Christianity in Devon
Christianity in Cornwall